Clinton Dotson McKinnon (February 5, 1906 – December 29, 2001) was an American Democratic politician and journalist from San Diego. He served two terms in the United States House of Representatives from 1949 to 1953.

Biography 
McKinnon was born 1906 in Dallas, Texas to Dr. John and Tennie McKinnon. He was 12 and the only child when his father died and his mother, a nurse, raised him. He graduated from Palo Alto High School, Palo Alto, California. McKinnon attended Stanford University in 1924, attended the University of Geneva in 1930, and received a BA from University of Redlands in 1930.

McKinnon and his wife Lucille had two sons, Clinton Daniel (Dan) and Michael Dean (Mike), and a daughter Connie.

McKinnon was a journalist and owned newspapers in Texas and California. He started local throwaway newspapers and sold ads to local merchants.

He organized the only daily newspaper to begin during World War II, the San Diego Daily Journal in 1944 by stringing together several throwaways. The Journal competed  with the much larger The San Diego Union-Tribune. It was possible because the Franklin Roosevelt administration allocated newsprint, then under ration, to the Journal to compete with the Republican Tribune. Other Journal alumni included Tribune editor and columnist Neil Morgan and Congressman Lionel Van Deerlin. Van Deerlin recalled:
"He was one of the guys-very different from your standard publisher. At the company picnics, he would be pitching softballs. He would come through the newsroom and he would know the names of your kids and which ones had been sick."

McKinnon sold the paper in 1947, before running for Congress, and it was eventually absorbed into the Tribune.

Time described McKinnon as: "a jockey-sized little fireball with unruly black hair and bounding energy."

McKinnon was first elected to the House of Representatives in 1948, defeating Republican incumbent Charles K. Fletcher, founder of Home Federal Savings and Loan. During the campaign McKinnon hogged the stage for 15 min, keeping President Truman from speaking to the crowd waiting for him. Later in Washington, McKinnon apologized to Truman, and Truman glared back at McKinnon, then said: "Well, you got elected, didn't you? That's the only thing that matters."

McKinnon served until 1953. In Congress, he fought for water projects for San Diego. Gordon Luce, then the California Republican Party Chairman, said that he was a bright and hard-working leader that even political opponents respected. In 1952, instead of running for reelection, he ran for the Democratic nomination for Senator against better-known Republican Senator Bill Knowland. Candidates could then run in multiple party primaries in California, and Knowland won both the Republican and Democratic primaries. Since the Congressional districts were redrawn in 1952, McKinnon was the last Representative to serve all of San Diego County. McKinnon was a delegate to Democratic National Conventions in 1952 and 1956.

McKinnon preferred to be known as a journalist than a politician. His other ventures included the La Jolla Light, Coronado Journal, and radio station KSDJ (now KCBQ).

McKinnon died 2001 December 29 in La Jolla, California.

His son Michael D. is the majority stockholder in McKinnon Broadcasting, owner of San Diego Home & Garden Lifestyles Magazine, and a former Texas state legislator (1972–1976). His son C. Dan was the former owner of KSON radio, is a minority stockholder in McKinnon Broadcasting, ran for congress as a Republican in 1980, and was national campaign chairman of the Duncan Hunter for President campaign in 2008.

See also
 Bowman-Lamb, Molly. Clinton McKinnon and The New Voice for San Diego: San Diego Journal, History thesis, University of San Diego, 1996.
 "Member of Congress, newspaper owner dies. He was last representative of entire county of San Diego", The San Diego Union-Tribune, December 30, 2001, by Steve La Rue. Obituary includes portrait.
 "Out of the Valley", November 2, 1942, and "PM for Post Mortem", March 22, 1948, Time magazine

References

External links
 "Chapter 4: The City—the End of One Civic Dream", History of San Diego (1977) by Richard Pourade. Describes Journal during the war.

1906 births
2001 deaths
Politicians from Dallas
University of Redlands alumni
Journalists from California
Democratic Party members of the United States House of Representatives from California
American newspaper publishers (people)
20th-century American politicians
20th-century American journalists
American male journalists